STV Pathfinder is a traditionally rigged brigantine formerly operated by Toronto Brigantine Inc., a sail training organization based in Toronto, Ontario, Canada from 1963-2017. Pathfinder, along with her sister ship  (still in operation), operated a youth sail training program during the summer holidays. This program is one of the very few sail training programs where all of the crew except for the captain are youth (13–19 years old).

Specifications

History 

Pathfinder was built for the organization Toronto Brigantine Inc. (T.B.I.) from November 10, 1962, through 1963. She was constructed on the same plans of another sail training vessel based in Kingston named St. Lawrence II. Although hull and for the most part rig are almost identical, the interior of the two boats differs greatly. From construction until 2017 Pathfinder served as a sail training ship.  The three sister ships sailed to New York City in 1976 to participate  in the Tall Ships gathering of sail for the Bicentennial celebration. Pathfinder last major re-fit was in 1994 when she was out of service for a year whilst the interior, exterior, all systems, machinery and rig of the vessel was completely re-furbished. The ship was retired from Toronto Brigantine's fleet and sold to a private buyer in 2018.

Interior Layout 
Pathfinder is divided into six watertight compartments from fore to aft the: forepeak (general bosun stores, anchor chain bins); petty officer's mess (sleeping space for 4 petty officers); seamen's mess (sleeping and living space for up to 18 trainees, also includes the galley); engine room (area for engine, generator and batteries); wardroom (sleeping and living space for 6 wardroom officers, also includes the captain's cabin, a separate but not watertight compartment)and the afterpeak (mooring line and fender storage and steering gear)

References 

Training ships
Tall ships of Canada
Individual sailing vessels
Brigantines
1963 ships